USNS Kingsport (T-AG-164) was built as SS Kingsport Victory, a United States Maritime Commission VC2-S-AP3 (Victory) type cargo ship. During the closing days of World War II the ship was operated by the American Hawaiian Steamship Company under an agreement with the War Shipping Administration. After a period of layup the ship was operated as USAT Kingsport Victory by the Army under bareboat charter effective 8 July 1948. When Army transports were transferred to the Navy's Military Sea Transportation Service the ship continued as USNS Kingsport Victory (T-AK-239), a cargo transport . On 14 November 1961, after conversion into the first satellite communication ship, the ship was renamed Kingsport, reclassified as a general auxiliary, and operated as USNS Kingsport (T-AG-164).

The ship was sent to Lagos, Nigeria as the control station for Syncom 2 becoming the site of the first two way call by satellite by heads of state. The call was between Nigerian Prime Minister Abubakar Balewa aboard the Kingsport and President John F. Kennedy on 23 August 1963. In 1967 the ship underwent conversion and became a bathymetric and acoustic survey ship for the installation and maintenance of the then classified Sound Surveillance System (SOSUS) under the unclassified name of Project Caesar,

Construction
Kingsport Victory, a United States Maritime Commission VC2-S-AP3 (Victory) type cargo ship, was laid down 4 April 1944 with launch on 29 May and completion on 12 July 1944 with delivery to the War Shipping Administration (WSA) on the same day at Los Angeles. She was built under the Emergency Shipbuilding program under cognizance of the U.S. Maritime Commission.

World War II and Army service
Kingsport Victory was immediately placed in operation by the American-Hawaiian Steamship Company, under a War Shipping Administration general agency agreement, supplying troops in the Pacific.  She made trips between California and Pearl Harbor.  On 17 October 1944 she steamed from California, arriving at Milne Bay in New Guinea on 2 November.  She carried cargo to US troops and ships at Eniwetok, Iwo Jima, Guam, Ulithi atoll and Okinawa. Kingsport Victory was active delivering support for the Battle of Iwo Jima from 19 February to 26 March 1945. In battle she had to use her deck guns to defend against air attacks. Kingsport Victory received one Battle star for her service.  After the war, in December 1945 she steamed from Okinawa to Hong Kong, then Calcutta; through the Suez Canal she arrived at New York City on 27 February 1946. During 1946 she moved cargo from the US east and west coasts.

After the war, on 29 September 1947, she was taken out of service and placed in the reserve fleet at Lee Hall, Virginia. On 8 April 1948 the ship was taken out of reserve and bareboat chartered to the War Department for operation as the USAT 'Kingsport Victory a US Army Transport. During this time the ship was involved in a legal case, Johansen, v. United States, involving rights of an Army civil service employee crew member in personal injury cases. On 1 March 1950 she was removed from US Army Transport and transferred the US Navy.

Navy MSTS serviceKingsport Victory was among large Army ships transferred to the Navy's Military Sea Transportation Service (MSTS) with Kingsport Victory being transferred effective 1 March 1950. The ship carried military cargo for the next eleven years as USNS Kingsport Victory (T-AK-239). Kingsport Victory is seen in an Air Force documentary film on the construction of the Dew Line loading supplies at Norfolk, Virginia and unloading at Halifax, Nova Scotia.

Assigned to duty supporting the U.S. Army Satellite Communications Agency USNS Kingsport was further modified and, in August 1963 while in Lagos harbor, transmitted the first satellite voice call between heads of state when John F. Kennedy and Nigerian Prime Minister Abubakar Balewa aboard Kingsport spoke in a two-way call. A demonstration of transmission of oceanographic data was made between a research vessel off Africa via the ship and satellite to Washington. The first air to ship satellite communication took place when Navy aircraft off Virginia established voice communication with Kingsport which was off Morocco. Further satellite communications work took place in the Pacific and Indian Oceans. Kingsport then supported Project Gemini into March 1966. After conversion from satellite configuration, particularly removal of the large and very visible dome, Kingsport was engaged in acoustic work for the Navy supporting undersea surveillance programs.

Satellite communications ship Kingsport

On 24 September 1961, she was delivered to the Portland, Oregon facilities of Willamette Iron & Steel Company where she underwent conversion to become the first satellite communications ship.  On 14 November 1961 she was renamed Kingsport and reclassified AG-164.

Designed for use by the United States Army Satellite Communications Agency in the defense satellite communications programs, Project ADVENT, USNS Kingsport underwent extensive alteration during conversion. A special high frequency radio station was installed for ship-to-shore communications. She received advanced tracking and telemetry equipment and anti-roll stabilization tanks. In addition, a 30-foot, gyro-stabilized, computer-oriented, triaxial, parabolic antenna was installed on her afterdeck. Housed in a 53-foot, plastic, air-pressurized radome, this antenna permitted precision tracking of a high altitude satellite at any angle above the horizon.Kingsport sailed to Lagos, Nigeria after Syncom 2 had been successfully launched on 26 July 1963 to serve as the terminal control station during testing and evaluation of the satellite. On 23 August 1963, President John F. Kennedy in Washington, D.C., telephoned Nigerian Prime Minister Abubakar Balewa aboard the Kingsport docked in Lagos Harbor via Syncom 2, the first geosynchronous communication satellite. It was the first live two-way call between heads of state by satellite. Syncom 2 and Relay 1 linked Nigeria, Brazil and the United States with Kingsport transmitting through Syncom 2 to New Jersey and New Jersey via Relay 1 to Rio de Janeiro. The ship reached Rota, Spain on 3 October, staying until 6 October, then sailed supporting communication tests in the Mediterranean from 7 to 25 October. Tests of voice and teletype links between the United States and ships of the 6th Fleet successful with the ship visiting Leghorn, Italy and Beirut, Lebanon during the voyage. After arriving in Rota 26 October and completing additional experiments she sailed for Norfolk 9 November and arrived 21 November.Kingsport departed for the Pacific 17 February 1964 via Puerto Rico and the Panama Canal stopping at San Diego 13 March and reaching Pearl Harbor on 25 March 1964. For the next ten months the ship operated between  Pearl Harbor and Guam supporting further communication experiments including those related to the evaluation of SYNCOM 3 after its launching 19 August 1964. Further experiments extended throughout the Western Pacific and into the Indian Ocean until July 1965.

She then provided support for NASA's Gemini manned space shots serving as on station communications ship between Okinawa and the Philippines for Gemini 5 from 21 to 29 August. She supported three more Gemini flights between 4 December and 16 March 1966 before returning to the West Coast in April. She remained at San Francisco from 18 April to 27 October in a ready reserve status. During November she steamed to the East Coast, and in early 1967 was at New York undergoing repairs and alterations.

Survey ship
After completion of her communications support role the USNS Kingsport became a bathymetric and acoustic survey ship supporting Project Caesar, the installation and maintenance of the Sound Surveillance System (SOSUS), and undersea surveillance development. The ship was part of the "Caeasr fleet" under the technical control of the project's Program Manager, then Naval Electronics Systems Command (NAVELEX PME-124). Among the now published reports,  declassified in 2006, of the ship's work is a description of the Indian Ocean exercise code named BEARING STAKE that took place from January to April 1977.

Disposal
Kingsport was placed out of service on 31 Jan 1984, transferred to the Maritime Administration for layup on 29 August 1984 then transferred back to the Military Sealift Command for scientific research on 1 March 1990. The ship was withdrawn from the reserve fleet on 21 January 1992 for scrapping in India.

Honors
Crew of Naval Armed Guard on the SS Kingsport Victory earned "Battle Stars" in World War II for war action during the assault occupation of Assault occupation of Iwo Jima from 13 March 1945 to 16 March 1945.

References

Bibliography

*

External links
Personal account of USNS Kingsport
The Kingsport (Photo & patch)
USNS Kingsport (Falmouth, England) after removal of dome and in gray MSTS livery.
Bouncing Voice Off Satellite Part of Ship's Daily Grind

 

Victory ships
Ships built in Los Angeles
1944 ships
World War II merchant ships of the United States
Cold War auxiliary ships of the United States
Ships of the United States Army
Greenville Victory-class cargo ships
History of telecommunications
Survey ships of the United States Navy